On behalf of the Cook Islands, the Cook Islands Sports and Olympic Association (renamed the Cook Islands Sports and National Olympic Committee in 2002 sent a team that competed at the 2000 Summer Olympics in Sydney, Australia.

Athletics

Men

Sailing

References

Official Olympic Reports

Nations at the 2000 Summer Olympics
2000
2000 in Cook Islands sport